Hendo, also known as Songomeno, is a Bantu language in Dekese territory (Kasai province), Democratic Republic of the Congo.

References

Languages of the Democratic Republic of the Congo
Bushoong languages